Events from the year 2020 in Armenia.

Incumbents
President: Armen Sarkissian
Prime Minister: Nikol Pashinyan

Events
March 1 - 1st case of 2020 coronavirus pandemic in Armenia
March 16 - 2020 Armenian constitutional referendum postponed
March 18 - 444 people in quarantine in the Golden Palace Hotel of Tsaghkadzor and the Monte Melkonian Military College of Dilijan.
March 29 - Confirmed cases rise to 424
April 5 - Original planned date of the 2020 Armenian constitutional referendum
July 12-15 - July 2020 Armenian–Azerbaijani clashes
September 27-November 10 - The 2020 Nagorno-Karabakh war.
October 8 - Deaths reported to be caused by coronavirus reach over 1,000.
November 6 - COVID-19 cases reach over 100,000.
November 10 - 2020 Armenian protests

Deaths
 July 20 - Boka, singer and songwriter (b. 1949)
 October 28 - Gurgen Egiazaryan, politician and civil servant (b. 1948)
 November 14 - Armen Dzhigarkhanyan, Russian-Armenian actor (b. 1935)
 November 19 - 
Sebouh Chouldjian, Turkish-born Armenian Apostolic prelate, Archbishop of Gougark (since 1996) (b. 1959)
Manvel Grigoryan, military officer and politician, Deputy (2012–2018) (b. 1957)
 November 20 - Rita Sargsyan, Armenian socialite, First Lady (2008–2018) (b. 1962)

References

 
2020s in Armenia
Years of the 21st century in Armenia
Armenia
Armenia